Ladysmith, originally Oyster Harbour, is a town located on the 49th parallel north on the east coast of Vancouver Island, British Columbia, Canada. The local economy is based on forestry, tourism, and agriculture. A hillside location adjacent to a sheltered harbour forms the natural geography of the community.

, the population was 8,537. The area of the town was 11.99 square kilometres. Total private dwellings were 3,754. Population density was 711.9 people per square kilometre.

Ladysmith is served by the coast-spanning Island Highway, the Island Rail Corridor, nearby Nanaimo Airport and BC Ferries.

History 
James Dunsmuir founded Ladysmith about 1898, a year after he built shipping wharves for loading coal at Oyster Harbour (now Ladysmith Harbour) from the mine at Extension, nearer Nanaimo. Dunsmuir, owner of coal mines in the Nanaimo area, needed a location to house the families of his miners.  He chose to build the community at what was then known as Oyster Harbour, some 20 miles (32 km) south of his Extension mines.  Many buildings were moved from Extension and Wellington by rail and by oxen.

In 1900, Dunsmuir renamed the town in honour of the British lifting the siege of Ladysmith in South Africa (28 February 1900) during the Second Boer War. (The original town of Ladysmith in turn took its name from Juana María de los Dolores de León Smith, known as Lady Smith, the Spanish wife of Sir Harry Smith, the British Governor of the Cape Colony  and high commissioner in South Africa from 1847 to 1852.) The Town of Ladysmith was incorporated June 3, 1904.

Dunsmuir thought this would be a fitting tribute at the conclusion of the Boer War (which ended in 1902).  In addition to commemorating the end of the war by naming his town after Ladysmith, Dunsmuir also chose to name the streets of the community after British military personnel including: Field Marshall Lord Roberts, General John French, General Redvers Buller, General Sir Charles Warren, General Sir George White, Horatio Herbert Kitchener, Lieutenant-General Sir William Forbes Gatacre, Robert Stephenson Smyth Baden-Powell, Major General Lord Methuen, and Sir William Penn Symonds. The local high school yearbook was at one time called Spion Kop ("spy hill" in Afrikaans), in commemoration of the Battle of Spion Kop, a famous engagement in January 1900 in which the Boers defeated British troops during the Second Boer War.

Ladysmith experienced significant unrest and violence during the Vancouver Island coal miners' strike of 1912–1914.  The miners were striking because of a variety of long-standing safety concerns. During the strike, militia were dispatched to put down unrest and protect property.

The Seaforth Highlanders of Canada first saw active service in the summer of 1912 when rallies by striking coal miners in the area around Nanaimo led to rioting. A company from the Seaforths was sent to garrison the area. Order was eventually restored and maintained until the unit was called back to mobilize for war in August 1914.

In 2017, Ladysmith's historic First Avenue was named the best street in Canada by the Canadian Institute of Planners.

Demographics 

Religion 
According to the 2021 census, religious groups in Ladysmith included:
Irreligion (5,255 persons or 59.7%)
Christianity (3,335 persons or 37.9%)
Indigenous Spirituality (40 persons or 0.5%)
Judaism (30 persons or 0.3%)
Sikhism (30 persons or 0.3%)
Buddhism (25 persons or 0.3%)
Other (80 persons or 0.9%)

Ethnicity

Media 
The Ladysmith-Chemainus Chronicle, a weekly community paper on Vancouver Island with a circulation of 1,898, has been printed locally and was founded in 1908. It is circulated in the communities of Ladysmith and Chemainus, in central Vancouver Island. It is archived online in the Google news archive.

Education 
Ladysmith Secondary School is the only secondary school in Ladysmith. The area has three elementary schools: Ladysmith Primary School (Kindergarten to Grade 3), Ladysmith Intermediate School (Grade 4 to Grade 7), and École North Oyster Elementary (Kindergarten to Grade 7).  École North Oyster Elementary is a dual-track school, having both French immersion and English programs. Davis Road Elementary School (Kindergarten to Grade 7) was open from 1963 until June 2014 when it was closed due to being over capacity.

Business 
The Syfy original series Resident Alien is largely filmed within the town of Ladysmith. During production, many of the town's residents are employed as background performers. The town is transformed into the show's fictional setting of Patience, Colorado. Showrunner Chris Sheridan stated that production of the series is the subject of much attention and that residents often attempt to glean spoilers based on the observations of filming, leading certain scenes to filmed at night. He furthermore detailed that while the filming does create disruptions such as the temporary closures of streets, the show's crew makes every effort to be as respectful as possible.

Notable people 
Pamela Anderson, a Canadian-American actress, model and animal rights activist, was born and lived in Ladysmith until the age of 12. She returned to live permanently in Ladysmith in July 2019.
Stef Lang, a Canadian singer, songwriter, and producer. Lang grew up and attended Ladysmith Secondary School.
Kayla Lorette, actress and sketch comedian
Michelle Mylett, actress

Notes

References

External links

Populated coastal places in Canada
Towns in British Columbia
Populated places in the Cowichan Valley Regional District
Mid Vancouver Island